Lionel Dyck SCZ, also referred to as Colonel Dyck, is a Zimbabwean mercenary and former soldier. He was born in 1944 in Southern Rhodesia and served with the Rhodesian Army and Zimbabwe Defence Forces before founding Dyck Advisory Group (DAG) to offer protective military services in Africa.

Military career 
Dyck was born in 1944 in Southern Rhodesia. When he was 17, he joined the Rhodesian Army and was placed in the Rhodesian Light Infantry (RLI). However, he was court-martialed and expelled from the army after driving a Unimog whilst drunk, resulting in him killing an RLI soldier. He underwent education in South Africa and gave up drinking. He re-enlisted in the Rhodesian Army during the Rhodesian Bush War. He would later rise to become a major in the Rhodesian African Rifles (RAR). Following the country's transition into Zimbabwe, Dyck played a frontline role commanding the RAR in the 1981 Entumbane uprising.  The RAR were disbanded in 1981 and the majority of white officers had left the new Zimbabwe National Army. Dyck remained and helped with the foundation of Zimbabwe's parachute battalion from former RAR and Selous Scouts soldiers as well as former ZIPRA and ZANLA guerrillas. During this time he forged a close working relationship with the Zimbabwean Minister of Defence (later President) Emmerson Mnangagwa and was awarded the Silver Cross of Zimbabwe. In 1986, he was appointed as a Commissioner of Oaths. He retired from the army in 1990 as a colonel and moved to South Africa. Whilst in South Africa, he would become the commodore of the False Bay Yacht Club.

Mercenary career 
Whilst in South Africa, Dyck founded a demining and anti-poaching company. This business made him wealthy and he branched out into private military contracting, private security and animal conservation. Utilising his contacts with Mnangagwa, in 2008 he set up a company called MineTech where a WikiLeaks cable described them as "business partners". In 2012, he set up Dyck Advisory Group as a mercenary, demining and anti-poaching group. In 2019 and 2020, he was hired by the Government of Mozambique to provide air cover for Mozambique soldiers during the RENAMO insurgency. Dyck and his forces were credited with driving RENAMO out of Northern Mozambique. In 2021, he was hired by the Mozambique police to provide military assistance against Islamic terrorists in the Battle of Palma aged 77. Dyck's DAG had been accused by Amnesty International of firing into random crowds; however, Dyck responded by stating that armed insurgents running into crowds was a common tactic used by terrorists. Dyck also helped to co-ordinate the evacuation of civilians from the area.

References 

Living people
1944 births
Rhodesian mercenaries
Rhodesian Light Infantry personnel
Zimbabwean military leaders
Rhodesian businesspeople
Zimbabwean business executives
Conservationists
Rhodesian African Rifles personnel
White Zimbabwean businesspeople
White Rhodesian people
Zimbabwean male sailors (sport)